Ralph W. Underhill (August 8, 1941 – September 8, 2011) was an American college basketball coach, known for leading the Wright State Raiders men's basketball team for 18 seasons.

Education
Underhill graduated from Lloyd High School in Erlanger, Kentucky, where he lettered four times each in basketball, football, track, and baseball.  He then played collegiate basketball and ran track for Tennessee Tech.  As a junior, he was a member of the team that won the Ohio Valley Conference championship.

He received a Bachelor of Science degree in health and physical education from Tennessee Tech in 1964 and earned a Master of Arts degree in guidance and education in 1965 from Western Kentucky University, where he worked as a graduate assistant basketball coach.

Coaching career

Early years
Underhill was the head coach at Ohio County High School in Hartford, Kentucky and at Louisville Manual High School. His first collegiate coaching job was as an assistant coach under Ron Shumate at the University of Tennessee at Chattanooga.

Wright State
Underhill was the most successful coach in Wright State history, with a career total of 356 wins, including leading the team to an NCAA Division II National Championship in the 1982–83 season.

Hired as head coach for the 1978–79 season, Underhill led the Raiders for 18 seasons.  Including the national championship, his squads earned a total of seven Division II regional appearances before taking Wright State up to the Division I level in 1987–88.

He was recognized with three Great Lakes Region Coach of the Year awards and one Division II Coach of the Year award. Known for being a strong recruiter, Underhill had several All-Americans at Wright State:  Roman Welch (1980), Rodney Benson (1981) Gary Monroe (1983), Fred Moore (1984), Mark Vest (1985 and 1986), Grant Marion (1986) and Andy Warner (1986), and one player selected in the NBA draft (Vitaly Potapenko, 1996).

His 1993 team, led by star Bill Edwards, won the Mid-Continent Conference Tournament title against the University of Illinois at Chicago and advanced to the NCAA Division I men's basketball tournament as a 16 seed matched against Bobby Knight and the 1 seed Indiana Hoosiers. That year's IU team included Calbert Cheaney and Knight's son Pat Knight.

Yearly records

Halls of Fame
Mary and Al Schwarz Wright State Athletic Hall of Fame in 2003
Cincinnati Area Basketball Hall of Fame in 1997

References

1941 births
2011 deaths
American men's basketball coaches
American men's basketball players
Basketball coaches from Kentucky
Basketball players from Kentucky
Chattanooga Mocs baseball coaches
Chattanooga Mocs men's basketball coaches
College men's basketball head coaches in the United States
High school basketball coaches in the United States
People from Kenton County, Kentucky
Tennessee Tech Golden Eagles men's basketball players
Tennessee Tech Golden Eagles men's track and field athletes
Western Kentucky Hilltoppers basketball coaches
Western Kentucky University alumni
Wright State Raiders men's basketball coaches